Brian Deck is an American music producer and member of band Red Red Meat. He co-founded Idful Studios in 1988. Since becoming a full-time producer, Deck has worked with bands and artists including Modest Mouse, Iron & Wine, Califone, All Smiles, Fruit Bats, Gomez, The Grates, Holopaw, Baby & Hide, David Singer and David Berkeley. Brian currently works at Narwhal Studios (formerly Engine Studios) in Chicago.

Musician
Brian Deck attended college as a performance major and excelled at both drum set and general percussion instruments. On many of the albums Brian produces, he contributes some sort of instrument or vocal. Many of his albums include extensive percussion instruments and techniques. While recording the band Red Red Meat at Idful Studios he was asked to join the band behind the kit. He remained there until the bands disbanding in early 2000. Since then he has had a loose connection with Tim Rutili's Califone. He and Tim also collaborated with Modest Mouse frontman Isaac Brock for the band Ugly Casanova. Brian produced, and played drums on, their sole album, Sharpen Your Teeth; he also toured behind the record. According to Richard Edwards of Margot and the Nuclear So and So's, as of 2009 Brian will be the new drummer in his side project Vegetables.

Producer
Working early on out of Idful Studios with Brad Wood and later out of Engine Studios, Brian has produced a number of both local Chicago musicians as well as widely known international acts. He is represented exclusively by Andy Kipnes and Mark Beaven of Advanced Alternative Media.

Discography
Red Red Meat
Red Red Meat (Perishable Records, 1992)
Jimmywine Majestic (Sub Pop Records, 1994)
Bunny Gets Paid (Sub Pop Records, 1995)
There's a Star Above the Manger Tonight (Sub Pop Records, 1997)
Loftus (collaboration with Rex) (Perishable Records, 1999)

Ugly Casanova
Diggin Holes b/w Babys Clean Conscience (Sub Pop Records, 2002)
Sharpen Your Teeth (Sub Pop Records, 2002)

Production credits
{| class="wikitable sortable"
! width="33"|Year
! width="230" class="unsortable" |Album
! width="150" |Artist
|-
|align="center" rowspan="1"|2015
|The Horse Comanche 
|Chadwick Stokes
|-
|align="center" rowspan="1"|2014
|Somewhere Under Wonderland 
|Counting Crows
|-
|align="center" rowspan="1"|2013
|Intersections 
|Into It. Over It.
|-
|align="center" rowspan="1"|2013
|Ghost on Ghost 
|Iron & Wine
|-
|align="center" rowspan="1"|2013
|The Great Despiser 
|Joe Pug
|-
|align="center" rowspan="1"|2012
|Clill Blanzin 
|Moritat
|-
|align="center" rowspan="1"|2012
|Don't Let the Sun Go Down on Your Anger 
|River City Extension
|-
|align="center" rowspan="1"|2011
|This Life is Not Ours to Keep 
|New Ruins
|-
|align="center" rowspan="1"|2011
|Collider 
|Sam Roberts Band
|-
|align="center" rowspan="1"|2011
|No One Gets Any 
|Fair Fjola
|-
|align="center" rowspan="1"|2010
|Li(f)e
|Sage Francis
|-
|align="center" rowspan="1"|2010
|In Memory of Loss
|Nathaniel Rateliff
|-
|align="center" rowspan="1"|2009
|A New Tide
|Gomez
|-
|align="center" rowspan="1"|2009
|New Leaves
|Owen
|-
|align="center" rowspan="1"|2009
|Strange Light
|David Berkeley
|-
|align="center" rowspan="1"|2008
|Animal!
|Margot and the Nuclear So and So's
|-
|align="center" rowspan="1"|2008
|Not Animal
|Margot and the Nuclear So and So's
|-
|align="center" rowspan="1"|2008
|Saturday Nights & Sunday Mornings
|Counting Crows
|-
|align="center" rowspan="1"|2008
|Unicycle Loves You
|Unicycle Loves You
|-
|align="center" rowspan="1"|2008
|Live at Dead Lake
|Hot Club de Paris
|-
|align="center" rowspan="1"|2007
|The Shepherd's Dog
|Iron and Wine
|-
|align="center" rowspan="1"|2007
|Sons of Guns
|Probably Vampires
|-
|align="center" rowspan="1"|2007
|Banging Down the Door
|Ezra Furman and the Harpoons
|-
|align="center" rowspan="1"|2006
|This Harness Can't Ride Anything
|Chin up Chin Up
|-
|align="center" rowspan="1"|2006
|Roots & Crowns
|Califone
|-
|align="center" rowspan="1"|2006
|Gravity Won't Get You High
|The Grates
|-
|align="center" rowspan="1"|2006
|For The Masses
|The You
|-
|align="center" rowspan="1"|2006
|The Animal Years
|Josh Ritter
|-
|align="center" rowspan="1"|2005
|The Plural of the Choir
|Settlefish
|-
|align="center" rowspan="1"|2005
|That These Things Could Be Ours
|Robert Skoro
|-
|align="center" rowspan="1"|2004
|Our Endless Numbered Days
|Iron and Wine
|-
|align="center" rowspan="1"|2004
|Hark/Sigh
|Baby & Hide
|-
|align="center" rowspan="1"|2004
|Stars Burn Out
|David Singer & the Sweet Science
|-
|align="center" rowspan="1"|2003
|Mouthfuls
|Fruitbats
|-
|align="center" rowspan="1"|2003
|Holopaw
|Holopaw
|-
|align="center" rowspan="1"|2003
|Fear Not The Breakdown
|R. D. Roth and The Issues
|-
|align="center" rowspan="1"|2002
|September 000
|The Secret Machines
|-
|align="center" rowspan="1"|2002
|Sharpen Your Teeth
|Ugly Casanova
|-
|align="center" rowspan="1"|2002
|The Silver Line
|Chris Mills
|-
|align="center" rowspan="1"|2002
|Inhabiting the Ball
|Jim Roll
|-
|align="center" rowspan="1"|2001
|Everywhere and His Nasty Parlour Tricks
|Modest Mouse
|-
|align="center" rowspan="1"|2001
|Roomsound
|Califone
|-
|align="center" rowspan="1"|2000
|The Moon and Antarctica
|Modest Mouse
|-
|align="center" rowspan="1"|1997
|There's a Star Above the Manger Tonight
|Red Red Meat
|-
|align="center" rowspan="1"|1992
|Baling Wire & Bubble Gum
|Every Good Boy
|-
|align="center" rowspan="1"|1990
|Social Graces
|Every Good Boy
|-
|align="center" rowspan="1"|1988
|Mederios
|Wheat (Band)
|-
|}

References

External links
All Deck'd Out from Harp Magazine
Owls take flight from Mix Magazine
Brian Deck from Tape Op Magazine

Record producers from Illinois
Living people
Ugly Casanova members
Califone members
Red Red Meat members
Year of birth missing (living people)